Poljica may refer to:

 Republic of Poljica (Repubblica di Poglizza), an autonomous community in Dalmatia which existed between the 13th and early 19th century
 , a village near Jelsa on the island of Hvar, Croatia
 Poljica, Krk, a village on the island of Krk, Croatia
 Poljica, Danilovgrad, a village in the Danilovgrad municipality

See also
Poljice (disambiguation)